"Brrr" is a song by Kim Petras, released as a single on 20 January 2023. The track features production work by Ilya.

Composition
NME Emma Wilkes described the song as an "industrial-inspired pop track". Writers for Billboard called "Brrr" a "hypnotic" hyperpop track, and the Dallas Voice said the song has "industrial beats and bad bitch energy". Cillea Houghton of American Songwriter said, "The song features a throbbing beat layered by Petras’ crisp vocals as she takes on the persona of a fearless character."

Promotion
After posting a snippet of the song on 8 January through her social media, Petras officially announced the release of the song on 11 January.

Petras performed the song on Late Night with Seth Meyers on 23 January, four days after its release. She also performed it on 1 March at the 2023 Billboard Women in Music ceremony.

References

2023 singles
2023 songs
Hyperpop songs
Kim Petras songs